Semionotus (from  , 'mark' and  , 'back') is an extinct genus of ray-finned fish found throughout Northern Pangaea (North America and Europe) during the late Triassic, becoming extinct in the Early Jurassic.

References

External links
"Semionotus elegans"-Photo-High Res--"Shuttle Meadow Formation"-Hartford Basin, Connecticut; Article – www.sunstar-solutions.com–"Basal Jurassic Dinosaur Fossils"

Semionotiformes
Prehistoric ray-finned fish genera
Triassic bony fish
Mesozoic fish of Europe
Mesozoic fish of North America
Taxa named by Louis Agassiz